The Colombian National Time Trial Championship is a road bicycle race that takes place inside the Colombian National Cycling Championship, and decides the best cyclist in this type of race. The first edition took place in 1999. The first winner of the time trial championship was Marlon Pérez. Israel Ochoa holds the record for the most wins in the men's championship with 3, Daniel Martínez is the current champion.

Multiple winners

Men

Elite

U23

Women

Elite

External links
Past winners on cyclingarchives.com

National road cycling championships
Cycle races in Colombia
Recurring sporting events established in 1999
1999 establishments in Colombia
Cycling